The Bauer Bank Block, at 107 W. Grand Ave. in Mancos, Colorado, was built in 1905.  It was listed on the National Register of Historic Places in 2003.

It was home of the Bauer Bank, founded in 1886.

It has also been known as Bauer Bank Building.

Its second floor was the first administrative headquarters for Mesa Verde National Park, during 1907 to 1911.

A portion of the building served as U.S. post office from 1927 to 1965.

References

		
National Register of Historic Places in Montezuma County, Colorado
Early Commercial architecture in the United States
Commercial buildings completed in 1905
1905 establishments in Colorado
Bank buildings on the National Register of Historic Places in Colorado